"World Turning" is a song by Australian musical group Yothu Yindi, released in October 1993 as the lead single from Yothu Yindi's second third album Freedom. "World Turning" peaked at No. 56 on the ARIA Singles Chart.

Track listing
Australian CD single
 "World Turning" (Räwak Mix) – 3:52
 "World Turning" (Another Pond Mix) – 4:26
 "Gapu" (Vibe Mix)	– 5:04
 "Wilawila" – 0:46
 "World Turning" (Djana Mix) – 8:09

Charts

References

1993 songs
1993 singles
Yothu Yindi songs
Songs about Australia